Laskar may refer to:

 Rejaul Karim Laskar, an Indian politician and scholar of India's foreign policy and diplomacy
 Jacques Laskar (b. 1955), a French astronomer
 Secunderabad, Andhra Pradesh, India 
 Lascars, Indian sailors who worked for the East India Company in the 17th and 18th centuries
 Lashkar-e-Taiba, a terrorist organization based in Pakistan
 Laskar, Bulgaria a village in Pleven Province, Bulgaria
 Laskár, a village and municipality in Žilina Region, Slovakia
Leşkər, Azerbaijan

See also
 Lascar (disambiguation)
 Lasker (disambiguation)
 Lashkar (disambiguation)